Walker Racing was a racing team founded by Derrick Walker in 1991 racing originally in the CART Championship Car series. It last competed in the United SportsCar Championship under the name of Team Falken Tire until Falken Tire pulled out of not only the series but the team in general at the conclusion of the 2015 United SportsCar Championship season.

Early success
The team was founded by Walker, who purchased the left over assets of the former Porsche Indy team. In the first season, 1991, the team successfully qualified rookie Willy T. Ribbs at the Indy 500.

In 1992, the team fielded Scott Goodyear on a full-time basis who won at Michigan and nearly won the 1992 Indianapolis 500. He was joined beginning with the 1993 Indianapolis 500 by Willy T. Ribbs who raced with the team until the end of the 1994 season. The team ran a third full-time car in 1993 for Hiro Matsushita.

Goodyear was replaced at the beginning of the 1994 season by Robby Gordon who raced with the team with Valvoline sponsorship until 1996. Gordon raced alongside teammate Mark Smith who was a championship contender in Indy Lights and showed promise in his 1993 CART rookie season but had a difficult 1994 season with the Walker Racing team. Smith was replaced by rookie Christian Fittipaldi in 1995 who finished second in the Indy 500 and finished 15th in points.

As a results of the CART-IRL split in 1996, the Walker team elected to participate in both races with Gordon and Fredrik Ekblom driving in the U.S. 500 and Mike Groff racing in the 1996 Indianapolis 500.

In 1997, Gil de Ferran took over the Valvoline car and was the runner up in the championship that year, despite not scoring a victory. De Ferran stayed with the team until 1999, a year where he finally broke through and scored his first victory for the team, the team's first since Gordon's win at Detroit in 1995.

A series of pay drivers
With no driver or sponsorship for the 2000 season, the team was forced to take on pay driver Shinji Nakano who finished a disappointing 24th in points. Meanwhile, the team entered the Indy Racing League's IndyCar Series in 2000 with rookie female driver Sarah Fisher who was inconsistent but fast in her two years with the team, scoring a career-best finish of 2nd place at Homestead-Miami Speedway in 2001. Nakano was replaced in the team's CART entry in 2001 by countryman Tora Takagi who brought Pioneer Electronics sponsorship to the team. Takagi managed slightly improved results over Nakano scoring 10 top-10 finishes in his two seasons with the team. The team also attempted to field Oriol Servia in the 2002 Indianapolis 500 but he failed to qualify.

Takagi left to the IRL in 2003 and the void was filled by Mexican driver Rodolfo Lavin who brought Corona sponsorship. Walker ran Darren Manning full-time in a second car with a variety of different sponsors and he finished 9th in points while Lavin only managed 18th.

Both drivers were gone for 2004 as the series morphed into the Champ Car World Series.  Brazilian Mario Haberfeld drove the team's only full-time car. Late in that season Australian businessman Craig Gore bought into the team and it became Team Australia.

Team Australia

In 2005 the team took an Australian turn due to its new sponsorship, with the addition of Aussie Vineyards sponsorship and Australian rookie driver Marcus Marshall joining Canadian veteran Alex Tagliani as the team returned to two full-time cars. Will Power made his debut in a third car at the 2005 Lexmark Indy 300 in Australia and replaced Marshall for the season finale in Mexico. The pair of Tagliani and Power continued with the team in 2006 and Tagliani was replaced by 2006 Champ Car Atlantic Series champion Simon Pagenaud in 2007. Power won two races in 2007 including the season opener in Las Vegas, the team's first victory since Gil De Ferran was with the team.

Walker initially indicated that he believed that the Champ Car World Series had run its last race and he was preparing to race in the IRL IndyCar Series in 2008. However, on March 9 the team announced that it would not race in the IndyCar Series in 2008 as it was unable to find adequate funding to do so as sponsor Aussie Vineyards jumped ship to KV Racing.  Walker Racing did finally appear in the 2008 season in a joint effort with Vision Racing at Edmonton to run Paul Tracy.

Walker fielded Stefan Wilson for a partial season campaign in Indy Lights in 2009.

American Le Mans Series
In 2011, Derrick Walker joined forces with Team Falken Tire to run a Porsche 997 GT3-RSR in the upcoming American Le Mans Series season in the GT class. Falken's motorsports division made their ALMS début in 2009 racing certain events before entering a full 2010 season. The team took its maiden victory at the 2011 Mid-Ohio Sports Car Challenge in which heavy rain towards the end of the race which favoured the team as the rain tires Falken developed were considerably better than those of Michelin and Dunlop. Wolf Henzler, one of the drivers in the race was in seventh when the rain started falling and went up to fifth before the safety car came out. In the restart, Henzler overtook the next four cars in a single lap to take the lead before the red flags came out around ten minutes before the end of the race. It was also the first win for a team running on Falken Tires and also the first wins for drivers Wolf Henzler and Bryan Sellers.

Ed Carpenter Racing
In 2012, Derrick Walker returned to the IndyCar Series as team manager for Ed Carpenter Racing, co-owned by Tony George and driver Ed Carpenter.  The team is based in the Walker Racing facility and utilizes Walker Racing's equipment and personnel.

Closure
On 20 November 2016 the team was put up for auction after a year of searching for a replacement sponsor for its IMSA team. On 6 December 2016 after the auction is complete the team will be officially listed as defunct.

Drivers

CART/CCWS
 Jon Beekhuis (1992)
 David Besnard (2004)
 Gil de Ferran (1997-1999)
 Luis Diaz (2003)
 Fredrik Ekblom (1996)
 Christian Fittipaldi (1995)
 A. J. Foyt (1992)
 Memo Gidley (1999)
 Scott Goodyear (1991-1993, 1996)
 Robby Gordon (1994-1996)
 Mike Groff (1992, 1996)
 Mario Haberfeld (2004)
 Naoki Hattori (1999)
 Bryan Herta (2000)
 Rodolfo Lavín (2003)
 Buddy Lazier (1991)
 Darren Manning (2003)
 Marcus Marshall (2005)
 Hiro Matsushita (1993)
 Shinji Nakano (2000)
 Simon Pagenaud (2007)
 Will Power (2005-2007)
 Willy T. Ribbs (1991-1994)
 Mark Smith (1994)
 Alex Tagliani (2005-2006, 2008)
 Tora Takagi (2001-2002)
 Michael Valiante (2004)
 Charles Zwolsman (2005)

IRL IndyCar Series
 Paul Tracy (2008)
 Sarah Fisher (2000-2001)
 Mike Groff (1996)

Racing results

Complete CART FedEx Championship Series results
(key) (results in bold indicate pole position) (results in italics indicate fastest lap)

 The Firestone Firehawk 600 was canceled after qualifying due to excessive g-forces on the drivers.

Complete IRL IndyCar Series results
(key)

 Run to Champ Car specifications.
 Non-points-paying, exhibition race.
 Run in conjunction with Vision Racing.

References

1991 establishments in the United States
American auto racing teams
American Le Mans Series teams
Champ Car teams
IndyCar Series teams
Indy Lights teams
2016 disestablishments in the United States
Auto racing teams disestablished in 2016
WeatherTech SportsCar Championship teams
Atlantic Championship teams
Formula BMW teams